Jacqueline Jeanne Victorine Kermina (30 June 1927 – 21 August 1995) was a French tennis player and coach.

Born in Paris, Kermina was active as a player in the 1950s and 1960s. She reached the singles third round of the French Championships twice and was a mixed doubles semi-finalist in 1954, with Mervyn Rose.

Kermina had a long association with the France Federation Cup team as a coach, serving three stints as captain. She first led the side in 1969 and 1970, then from 1973 to 1975, before returning for one final campaign in 1977.

References

1927 births
1995 deaths
French female tennis players
French tennis coaches
Tennis players from Paris